William Allen Walsh (20 August 1887 – 18 October 1940) was a Conservative member of the House of Commons of Canada. He was born in Kingston, Ontario and became a school principal, school superintendent and teacher, primarily at the Protestant Strathcona Academy in the Montreal suburb of Outremont.

He was first elected to Parliament at the Mount Royal riding in the 1935 general election. After serving one term, the 18th Canadian Parliament, Walsh entered the March 1940 election under the Conservative-based National Government party banner but was defeated by Fred Whitman of the Liberal party. Walsh died months later, on 18 October 1940.

References

External links 
 

1887 births
1940 deaths
Canadian schoolteachers
Members of the House of Commons of Canada from Quebec
Conservative Party of Canada (1867–1942) MPs